{{Infobox animanga/Video
| type            = TV series
| director        = 
| producer        = {{ubl|Hiroyoshi Ōkura|Kenjirō Kawando|Executive producer:'''|Dynamite Tommy}}
| writer          = Atsuhiro Tomioka
| music           = Project Baki
| studio          = Group TAC
| licensee        = 
| network         = TV Tokyo
| network_en      = 
| first           = January 8, 2001
| last            = December 24, 2001
| episodes        = 48
| episode_list    = List of Baki the Grappler episodes
}}

 is a Japanese manga series written and illustrated by Keisuke Itagaki. It was originally serialized in the shōnen manga magazine Weekly Shōnen Champion from 1991 to 1999 and collected into 42 tankōbon volumes by Akita Shoten. The story follows teenager Baki Hanma as he trains and tests his fighting skills against a variety of different opponents in deadly, no rules hand-to-hand combat.

A 45-minute original video animation (OVA) was released in 1994. A 24-episode anime aired on TV Tokyo between January 8 and June 25, 2001, and was quickly followed by a second 24-episode series from July 22 to December 24, 2001. An original net animation (ONA) was released on Netflix between June 25 and September 24, 2018, followed by a second season that was released on June 4, 2020. The third season was released on September 30, 2021.  A fourth season has been announced . The OVA was the first to be licensed and released in North America, in 1998 by Central Park Media, followed by the original manga series in 2002 by Gutsoon! Entertainment (incomplete), and finally both anime series in 2005 by Funimation Entertainment. Media Do International began releasing the second manga series digitally in August 2018. The Baki series is one of the best-selling manga of all time, with over 85 million copies in circulation.

Plot

Baki Hanma is raised by his wealthy mother, Emi Akezawa, who also funds his training in the hopes that he can be a powerful warrior like his father, Yujiro Hanma. Around the start of the series, Baki outgrows traditional training and heads out to follow the path of his ruthless father's training and meets many powerful fighters along the way. Eventually, Baki fights his father and is beaten without a challenge. Emi who tries to save him is killed by his father, causing Baki to feel hatred against his old man.

After being beaten, Baki travels around the world continuing his training. Years down the road he finds an underground fighting arena where he fights some of the most powerful fighters of various styles of martial arts. It is here he truly begins to hone his martial arts skills. He intends to get stronger, surpass his father and continue to endure and survive the numerous hurdles he encounters in his journey.

Media

Manga

Main series

 ― Original series, serialized in Weekly Shōnen Champion from 1991 to 1999. Collected into 42 volumes, that encompasses the Champion, the Kid, and the Maximum Tournament sagas. From 2007 to 2008, it was collected into a 24-volume kanzenban edition.

This series was licensed for a North American release by Gutsoon! Entertainment, who retitled it Baki the Grappler. They published the first 46 chapters in their English-language manga anthology magazine Raijin Comics. The magazine's first issue was released on December 18, 2002, but in July 2004 it was discontinued. Four collected volumes were planned but it is unknown if they were released.

 ― Second series, also serialized in Weekly Shōnen Champion from 1999 to November 24, 2005. Collected into 31 volumes, and encompasses The Prisoners, the Chinese Challenge, and the Alai Jr. sagas.

This series is licensed for English release by Media Do International, who released it digitally between August 2018 and August 2019. The company stated a future print release is possible and that they are interested in the original manga as well.

 ― Third series, again serialized in Weekly Shōnen Champion, began on December 1, 2005 and ended on August 16, 2012. Collected into 37 volumes, and encompasses the Shadow Fighting, Oliva's Fortress, The Prehistoric Menace, Retsu Kaiou's Boxing, and the final confrontation of Yujiro and Baki.
 ― Fourth series, serialized in Weekly Shōnen Champion from March 20, 2014 to April 5, 2018. It features Miyamoto Musashi who is challenged by various Baki characters after being revived into modern-day age. Collected into 22 volumes.
 ― Fifth series, began serialization in Weekly Shōnen Champion on October 4, 2018. It has the same name as the fourth, but with Baki's name written in katakana instead of kanji. It features Nomi no Sukune. Collected into 14 volumes to date.

Gaiden
 - Set immediately after the Maximum Tournament, it depicts a wrestling match between Antonio Igari and Mount Toba. Nine chapters published in one volume in 1999. An epilogue for Igari ran in Weekly Shōnen Champions 48th issue on October 27, 2022.
 - Side story that develops at the same time as volume 15 of the second manga. One volume published in 2002.
 - Spinoff series, written and illustrated by Yukinao Yamauchi, depicting Kaoru Hanayama's yakuza adventures. Ran from March 2005 to December 2007 in Champion Red, then from July 2009 in Weekly Shōnen Champion. Collected into eight volumes.
 - Set after volume 10 of the third manga, it introduces Pickle. Published in one volume in 2008.
 - Spinoff series, written and illustrated by Hitoshi Tomizawa, starring Gaia. Published in Weekly Shōnen Champion in 2009.
 - Comedic spinoff, written and illustrated by Naoki Saito. Originally launched digitally on Weekly Shōnen Champion The Web in 2010, then serialized irregularly in Weekly Shōnen Champion and finally Bessatsu Shōnen Champion until October 2014. Collected into three volumes.
 - Spinoff series, written and illustrated by Yukio Yamauchi, based on Kaoru Hanayama's adventures in high school. Began in Bessatsu Shōnen Champion in July 2012. Collected into three volumes.
 - Spinoff series, written and illustrated by Kengou Miyatani, representing and describing Doppo's adventures. Began in Champion Red in June 2013. Collected into one volume.
 - A collection of tales that happen within the Baki world, written by the author Baku Yumemakura about the older brother of Katsumi Orochi by the name of Mumon Katsuragi. He is mostly responsible of the capture of the five most deadly criminals before we meet them in Baki. It also includes characters from his own Garōden and Shishi no Mon novels, and is illustrated by Keisuke Itagaki. Published in Weekly Shōnen Champion since 2018. Collected into five volumes as of February 2022.
 is a special spin-off consisting of five chapters, each about one of the death row prisoners from the "Most Evil Death Row Convicts" arc, that have been added to the shinsōban edition of Baki in 2018.
 - Spinoff series, illustrated by Eiji Murai and crediting Itagaki and Sai Ihara with the original story. An isekai series depicting Retsu Kaioh reincarnated into another world. It began in the November 6, 2020 issue of Monthly Shōnen Champion. Collected into five volumes as of June 2022.
 - Spinoff series, illustrated by Takaaki Hayashi, set a few days after Gaia and Sikorsky's fight. It began in the October 6, 2022 issue of Monthly Shōnen Champion.

SupplementsGrappler Baki: Red Dragon Side, Grappler Side - Compendium of the characters and events in the world of Grappler Baki, covers until volume 23 of the second saga.Grappler Baki: Blue Tiger Side, Fighting Side - Compendium of every battle fought and its results in the world of Grappler Baki, also covers until volume 23 of the second saga.

Original video animations
A 45-minutes original video animation (OVA) was released in 1994. The story is a close adaptation of the first few volumes of the original manga, adapting the Karate Tournament arc (not adapted in the later TV series) and Baki's fight with Shinogi Koushou, later adapted in the episode 18 of the Baki the Grappler TV series. It was licensed and released under the title Grappler Baki: The Ultimate Fighter in North America by Central Park Media on VHS on December 1, 1996 and on DVD on December 1, 1998. Manga Entertainment later released it in Australia and the United Kingdom.

However, it adapts the arc of the same name from the second manga series, which is titled simply Baki. Created by Telecom Animation Film, it was directed by Teiichi Takiguchi and focuses on five inmates who break out of prison from around the world and travel to Japan.

Anime

A 24-episode anime series aired on TV Tokyo between January 8, 2001 and June 25, 2001. The anime was produced by Free-Will, a music record label. A second 24-episode series, titled  as it tells the story from that part of the manga, aired from July 23, 2001 to December 24, 2001. All of the series' music was written and composed by "Project Baki", and all the theme songs performed by Ryōko Aoyagi. For the second series, "All Alone" is used as the opening and "Loved..." as the closing. Baki the Grappler: Original Soundtrack was released on March 27, 2003.

Both series were licensed for a North American English release by Funimation Entertainment. They released both series as one on 12 DVDs, each with four episodes, beginning on June 14, 2005 with the last released on February 27, 2007. Two box sets were released on January 23, 2007 and March 25, 2008, the first included volumes 1-6 (1st series), while the second included 7-12 (2nd series). A set including every episode was released on September 2, 2008.

Funimation's English version was one of the launch-shows on their own television channel, Funimation Channel, which debuted on June 19, 2006. Baki was broadcast on weekends at 11:30pm, switching to the 10:00pm slot on September 4, 2006. Dubbed in English, the episodes were edited for time but do not appear to have been edited for content. The opening theme is the song "Child Prey" by Japanese metal band Dir en grey, who is signed to Free-Will.

In December 2016, it was announced that the "Most Evil Death Row Convicts" arc of the second manga series would be receiving an anime television adaptation. Titled Baki, like the second manga series, the 26-episode series is directed by Toshiki Hirano at TMS Entertainment with character designs handled by Fujio Suzuki and scripts overseen by Tatsuhiko Urahata. It began streaming on Netflix on June 25, 2018 in Japan, and started streaming on December 18, 2018 outside Japan. The series then started airing on several Japanese television channels beginning with Tokyo MX1 on July 1. Its opening theme song is "Beastful" by Granrodeo and its ending theme "Resolve" is performed by Azusa Tadokoro with lyrics by Miho Karasawa. Sentai Filmworks released it on Blu-ray on May 25, 2021 with a new English dub.

Netflix renewed the series for a second season on March 19, 2019. On March 5, 2020, it was announced that the main staff TMS Entertainment would be returning to produce the second season with the addition of a new character designer and art director. The 13 episode second season covering the "Great Chinese Challenge" and the Alai Jr. arcs was released exclusively on Netflix on June 4, 2020. Its opening theme is "Jounetsu wa Oboete Iru" performed by Granrodeo and its ending theme is "Dead Stroke" performed by Ena Fujita.

In September 2020, it was announced Hanma Baki - Son of Ogre will be adapted as the third series and the sequel to the second season of the Netflix series. The 12-episode series was released on Netflix on September 30, 2021 as Baki Hanma. The show's opening theme is "Treasure Pleasure" performed by Granrodeo while its ending theme is "Unchained World" performed by Generations from Exile Tribe. A second season was announced on March 24, 2022.

Video games
There have been a few video games based on the series. Baki the Grappler: Ultimate Championship was released for Android in 2017. A card game for web browsers called Typing Grappler Baki was created. Another browser game, Hanma Baki - Baki, was for Yahoo! Mobage. Yujiro Hanma appears as an unlockable character in the Playstation 2 game, Garouden Breakblow: Fist or Twist.

Reception
As of May 2021, the various Baki series had over 85 million collected volumes in circulation. The Baki Gaiden: Scarface spin-off series had 3.5 million copies in print as of February 2019.

Allen Divers and Jason Thompson, both writing for Anime News Network, briefly described the series as "very compelling" and a "demented fighting manga", respectively.

Anime News Network had four different writers review the first volume of the second manga series. Faye Hopper scored it the highest, four out of five, and wrote that she was captivated the entire read with its appeal lying in "its absurdity held up by its absolutely incredible artistry." Amy McNulty gave it a 2.5 rating and also praised Itagaki's art, but felt the character designs were not particularly memorable. She also wrote that the volume "succeeds in identifying the stakes, but it completely fails in anchoring the reader with characters to care about." Rebecca Silverman and Teresa Navarro both gave it a 2 and noted its status as a "set-up book," with each new character introduced in the same manner. Both Hopper and Silverman said that Baki reminded them of JoJo's Bizarre Adventure.

Reviewing the first 24 episodes of the 2001 anime, Mark Thomas of Mania Entertainment gave it a B− rating, stating that fans of shōnen and fight series would enjoy it, but others should look elsewhere. He felt it had plenty of good, realistic fight scenes, but fell short on the story. Explaining that despite a lot of story arcs, it ultimately feels like a setup for the second season. Thomas gave the same rating to the final 24 episodes, and "mildly recommended" the series. While he started to enjoy this set more thanks to its more action focus, he stated that not showing Baki's final fight with Yujiro, which was built up the entire show, really ruined it for him.

The 2012 comedy film Graffreeter Toki is based on the March 2011 play of the same name, which in turn was inspired by Grappler Baki.

Sociologist Junko Kaneda interpreted Baki the Grappler as homoerotic and published an essay book about it titled Notes of a Girl Who Spent 30 Hours a Day for 300 Days Thinking "So Baki The Grappler Is BL, Right?"'' The essay was adapted into a live-action television series titled  that was broadcast on Wowow in August 2021.

References

External links

25th Anniversary website 
 2001 anime official website 
 2018 anime official website 
 

 
1991 manga
1994 anime OVAs
1999 manga
2001 anime television series debuts
2005 manga
2014 manga
2018 manga
2018 anime ONAs
2021 anime ONAs
Akita Shoten manga
Anime series based on manga
Funimation
Group TAC
Japanese-language Netflix original programming
Manga adapted into television series
Martial arts anime and manga
Martial sports in anime and manga
Netflix original anime
Shōnen manga
TMS Entertainment
TV Tokyo original programming
Yakuza in anime and manga
Prisons in anime and manga